Eisstadion Biel was an arena in Bienne, Switzerland and was primarily used for ice hockey, serving as the home of EHC Biel from 1973 to 2015. Bienne Eisstadion held up to 9,400 people, but due to safety concerns capacity was reduced to 7000 in later years. 

The new home of EHC Biel is the multisport-complex Tissot Arena

Some photos of the demolition:

External links 
 Arena information

Indoor arenas in Switzerland
Indoor ice hockey venues in Switzerland
Biel/Bienne
Sports venues in the Canton of Bern
1973 establishments in Switzerland
Sports venues completed in 1973
20th-century architecture in Switzerland